The Catholic Diocese of Fréjus–Toulon (Latin: Dioecesis Foroiuliensis–Tolonensis; French: Diocèse de Fréjus–Toulon) is a diocese of the Latin Church of the Catholic Church in southeastern France on the Mediterranean coast. The present diocese comprises the territory of the ancient Diocese of Fréjus as well as that of the ancient Diocese of Toulon. In 1957 it was renamed as the Diocese of Fréjus–Toulon.

Under the Civil Constitution of the Clergy the département of Var constituted a diocese, absorbing the former ancient dioceses of Toulon, Fréjus, Grasse and Vence. It was suppressed by the Concordat of 1801, re-established ineffectually by that of 1817, and definitively established in 1823, when its assigned territory comprised once more the whole département of Var. A Papal Brief of 1852 authorized the bishop to assume the title of Bishop of Fréjus and Toulon.  It was and has remained a suffragan of the Archdiocese of Aix-en-Provence and Arles,

The arrondissement of Grasse until 1860 belonged to the département of Var, when it was annexed to that of the Alpes-Maritimes. In  1886 it was separated from Fréjus and attached to the Diocese of Nice.

Since 16 May 2000, the Bishop of Fréjus–Toulon has been Bishop Dominique Marie Jean Rey.

History
Christianity would seem to have been introduced into Fréjus in the fourth century. In 374 a certain Acceptus, who had just been elected to the See of Fréjus, falsely declared himself guilty of some crimes in order to rid himself of the episcopal dignity. At the Council of Valence, which met in July of 374, he begged the Church to name another in his place.  The Council decided that his actions made it inappropriate for him to be consecrated a bishop.

Fréjus was completely destroyed by the Saracens in the early tenth century.  It was Bishop Riculfus who began the reconstruction of the cathedral.

The following are named among the bishops of this see:

Raymond Berengarius (1235–1248), who arranged the marriage of Beatrice, daughter of the Count of Provence, with Charles of Anjou
Jacques d'Euse (1300–1310), preceptor of St. Louis of Toulouse, and later pope under the name of John XXII
Cardinal Nicolò Fieschi (1495–1524), who at the time of his death was dean of the Sacred College (in 1524, from 20 May  to 14 June)
André-Hercule de Fleury (1698–1715).

Bishops

To 1000

 before 419 – 433: Leontius
 433–455: Theodorus
 463–465: Asterius
 475?: Auxilius
 484?–506: Victorinus
 ? 524: Joannes (Jean, John) 
 527–529: Lupercianus
 541: Dionysius (Didier)
 549–554: Expectatus
 582: Epiphanius
 636: Martin
 ...
 909–911: Benedict
 949–952: Gontar
 973–1000?: Riculfus

1000 to 1300

 1010–1044: Gaucelme
 1044–1091: Bertrand
 1091–1131: Berenger
 1131–1145: Bertrand II.
 1154–1157: Pierre de Montlaur
 1166–1198: Fredol d'Anduze
 1198–1202: Guillaume du Pont
 1203–1206: Raimond de Capella
 1206–1212: Bermond Cornut
 1212?–1215: Raimond de Puyricard
 1220: Olivier
 1224–1233?: Bertrand III. de Favas
 1235–1248: Raimond Berenguer
 1248–1264: Bertrand de Saint-Martin
 1264–1266: Pierre de Camaret
 1267–1280?: Guillaume de la Fonte
 1280?–1299: Bertrand V. Comarque

1300 to 1500

 1300–1310: Jacques Arnaud Duèze, later Pope John XXII
 1318–1318: Bertrand VI. d'Aimini
 1318–1340: Barthélémy Grassi
 1340–1343: Jean d'Arpadelle
 4 June 1343 – 14 March 1346: Guillaume d'Aubussac
 7 April 1346 – 1348: Pierre Alamanni
 1348: Pierre du Pin (electus: transferred to Viterbo 10 December 1348)
 2 March 1349 – 9 June 1360: Guillaume Amici (administrator) (also Bishop of Apt and Bishop of Chartres)
 1360–1361: Pierre Artaudi
 1361–1364: Guillaume de Ruffec
 1364–1371: Raimond Daconis
 1371–1385: Bertrand de Villemus
 1385: Emanuel 
 3 August 1385 – 13 April 1405: Louis de Bouillac
 9 September 1409 – 1 February 1422: Gilles Le Jeune
 1422–1449?: Jean Bélard
 1449–1452: Jacques Juvénal des Ursins
 1452–1453: Jacques Séguin
 1453–1455: Guillaume d'Estaing
 1455–1462: Jean du Bellay
 1462–1472: Léon Guérinet
 1472: Réginald d'Angline
 1472–1485: Urbano Fieschi (senior)
 15 March 1485 – 1487: Niccolò Fieschi (transferred to Agde)
 17 September 1487 – 26 November 1494: Rostan d'Ancesune (transferred to Embrun)
 25 February 1495 – 1511: Niccolò Fieschi

1500 to 1800

Under Louis XIV, who enjoyed the right to nominate bishops to all French sees with the exception of Metz, Verdun and Toul, the See of Fréjus was often an early stepping-stone for careers of clerics whose ambitions lay elsewhere.

 5 November 1511 – 23 January 1523:  Urbano Fieschi (junior) nephew of Cardinal Niccolò Fieschi
 1524 – 15 June 1424:  Cardinal Niccolò Fieschi
 1524–1534: Franciot des Ursins
 1525–1564: Léon des Ursins
 1565–1579: Bertrand de Romans
 1579–1591: François de Bouliers
 1591–1599?: Gérard Bellenger
 1599–1637: Barthélémy Camelin
 1637–1654: Pierre Camelin
 1658–1674: Zongo Ondedei
 1676–1678: Antoine de Clermont
 1679–1680: Louis d'Anglure de Bourlemont
 1681–1697: Luc d'Aquin
 1697–1699: Louis d'Aquin
 1699–1715: André-Hercule de Fleury (1. November 1698 bis 3. Mai 1715)
 1715–1739: Pierre de Castellane
 1739–1765: Martin du Bellay
 1766–1801: Emmanuel de Bausset
 1791–1799:  Jean-Joseph Rigouard (Constitutional Bishop of Var)

From 1800

 Suppressed 1801–1822
 Charles-Alexandre de Richery (8 August 1817 – 8 February 1829) (also Archbishop of Aix)
 Louis-Charles-Jean-Baptiste Michel (16 April 1829 – 22 February 1845)

 Casimir-Alexis-Joseph Wicart (29 March 1845 – 3 July 1855) (also Bishop of Laval)
 Joseph-Antoine-Henri Jordany (6 November 1855 – March 1876)
 Joseph-Sébastien-Ferdinand Terris (17 March 1876 – 8 April 1885)
 Fédéric-Henri Oury (2 March 1886 – 3 June 1890) (also Bishop of Dijon)
 Eudoxe-Irénée-Edouard Mignot (3 June 1890 – 7 December 1899) (auch Archbishop of Albi)
 Aloys-Joseph-Eugène Arnaud (7 December 1899 – 17 June 1905)
 Félix-Adolphe-Camille-Jean-Baptiste Guillibert (21 February 1906 – 31 May 1926)
 Auguste-Joseph-Marie Simeone (30 July 1926 – 22 October 1940)
 Auguste Joseph Gaudel (24 September 1941 – 30 June 1960)
 Henri-Louis-Marie Mazerat (30 July 1960 – 11 December 1961) (also Bishop of Angers)
 Gilles-Henri-Alexis Barthe (4 May 1962 – 8 February 1983)
 Joseph Théophile Louis Marie Madec (8 February 1983 – 16 May 2000)
 Dominique Marie Jean Rey (16 May 2000 – present)

Saints
The Island of Lérins, well known as the site of the celebrated monastery founded there in 410, was sold in 1859 by the bishop of Fréjus to an English purchaser. A number of the saints of Lérins are especially honoured in the diocese. Among them are Sts. Honoratus, Caesarius, Hilary, and Virgilius, all of whom became archbishop of Arles; Quinidius, Bishop of Vaison; Valerius, Bishop of Nice; Maximus, Bishop of Riez; Veranus and Lambertus, both Bishop of Vence; Vincent of Lérins, author of the Commonitorium, and his brother Lupus, Bishop of Troyes; Agricola, Bishop of Avignon; Aigulphus and Porcarius, martyrs; St. Tropesius, martyr during the persecution of Emperor Nero; St. Louis of Toulouse (1274–1297), a native of Brignoles, in the Diocese of Toulon, and later Archbishop of Toulouse; and the virgin St. Roseline, prioress of the monastery of La Celle-Roubaud, who died in 1329, and whose shrine, situated at Les Arcs near Draguignan, has been for six centuries a place of pilgrimage, are likewise especially honoured in the diocese.

The sojourn in 1482 of St. Francis of Paola at Bormes and at Fréjus, where he caused the cessation of the plague, made a lasting impression.

See also
Catholic Church in France

References

Bibliography

Reference works

 pp. 551–552. (Use with caution; obsolete)
  (in Latin) p. 252.
 (in Latin) p. 155.
 p. 197-198.
 pp. 189.
 pp. 203–204.
 p. 218.

Studies

 second edition (in French)

Font-Réaulx, J. de. La carte et la structure: Les évéques de Fréjus du VIe au XIIIe siècle

External links
  Centre national des Archives de l'Église de France, L'Épiscopat francais depuis 1919, retrieved: 2016-12-24.

acknowledgment

Frejus
Var (department)
1801 disestablishments in France
Frejus-Toulon
Frejus-Toulon
1817 establishments in France